Enterprise Integration Patterns is a book by Gregor Hohpe and Bobby Woolf and describes 65 patterns for the use of enterprise application integration and message-oriented middleware in the form of a pattern language.

The integration (messaging) pattern language 
The pattern language presented in the book consists of 65 patterns structured into 9 categories, which largely follow the flow of a message from one system to the next through channels, routing, and transformations. The book includes an icon-based pattern language, sometimes nicknamed "GregorGrams" after one of the authors. Excerpts from the book (short pattern descriptions) are available on the supporting website (see External links).

Integration styles and types
The book distinguishes four top-level alternatives for integration:
 File Transfer
 Shared Database
 Remote Procedure Invocation
 Messaging

The following integration types are introduced:
 Information Portal
 Data Replication
 Shared Business Function
 Service Oriented Architecture
 Distributed Business Process
 Business-to-Business Integration
 Tightly Coupled Interaction vs. Loosely Coupled Interaction

Messaging
 Message Channel
 Message
 Pipes and Filters
 Message Router
 Message Translator
 Message Endpoint

Message Channel
 Point-to-Point Channel
 Publish-Subscribe Channel
 Datatype Channel
 Invalid Message Channel
 Dead Letter Channel
 Guaranteed Delivery
 Channel Adapter
 Messaging Bridge
 Message Bus

Message Construction
 Command Message
 Document Message
 Event Message
 Request-Reply
 Return Address
 Correlation Identifier
 Message Sequence
 Message Expiration
 Format Indicator

Message Router
 Content-Based Router
 Message Filter
 Dynamic Router
 Recipient List
 Splitter
 Aggregator
 Resequencer
 Composed Message Processor
 Scatter-Gather
 Routing Slip
 Process Manager
 Message Broker

Message Transformation
 Envelope Wrapper
 Content Enricher
 Content Filter
 Claim Check
 Normalizer
 Canonical Data Model

Message Endpoint
 Messaging Gateway
 Messaging Mapper
 Transactional Client
 Polling Consumer
 Event-Driven Consumer
 Competing Consumers
 Message Dispatcher
 Selective Consumer
 Durable Subscriber
 Idempotent Receiver
 Service Activator

System Management
 Control Bus
 Detour
 Wire Tap
 Message History
 Message Store
 Smart Proxy
 Test Message
 Channel Purger

The pattern language continues to be relevant as of today, for instance in cloud application development and integration, and in the internet of things. In 2015, the two book authors reunited—for the first time since the publication of the book—for a retrospective and interview in IEEE Software.

Implementation
Enterprise Integration Patterns are implemented in many open source integration solutions. Notable implementations include Spring Integration, Apache Camel, Red Hat Fuse, Mule ESB and Guaraná DSL.

See also 
 Enterprise messaging system
 Loose coupling
 Software design pattern

References

External links

American non-fiction books
2003 non-fiction books
Software engineering books
Software design patterns
Enterprise application integration
Message-oriented middleware
Monographs